Midnapore City College is a private college in Midnapore, West Bengal, India. It offers different undergraduate and postgraduate degree courses. This college is recognized by the University Grants Commission and affiliated with the Vidyasagar University.

Schools 
This college offers different courses via five different schools.
School of Pure and Applied Sciences: It consists of the departments of Physics, Chemistry, Mathematics, Computer Science, and Geography.
School of Biological Sciences: It consists of the departments of Botany, Zoology, Fishery Science, and Agriculture.
School of Humanities: It consists of the departments of Bengali, English, History, and Sanskrit.
School of Education: It consists of the Department of Education.
School of Paramedical and Allied Health Sciences: It consists of the departments of Medical Microbiology, Medical Laboratory Technology, Nutrition, Hospital Management, Hospital Administration.

References

External links
https://mcconline.org.in/
University Grants Commission
National Assessment and Accreditation Council

Universities and colleges in Paschim Medinipur district
Universities and colleges in West Bengal
Educational institutions established in 2017
2017 establishments in West Bengal